The Ox (牛) is the second of the 12-year periodic sequence (cycle) of animals which appear in the Chinese zodiac related to the Chinese calendar, and also appears in related calendar systems. The Chinese term translated here as ox is in Chinese niú  (牛), a word generally referring to cows, bulls, or neutered types of the bovine family, such as common cattle or water buffalo. The zodiacal ox may be construed as male, female, neutered, hermaphroditic, and either singular or plural. The Year of the Ox is also denoted by the Earthly Branch symbol chǒu (丑). The term "zodiac" ultimately derives from an Ancient Greek term referring to a "circle of little animals". There are also a yearly month of the ox and a daily hour of the ox (Chinese double hour, 1:00 a.m. to 3:00 a.m.). Years of the oxen (cows) are cyclically differentiated by correlation to the Heavenly Stems cycle, resulting in a repeating cycle of five years of the ox/cow (over a sixty-year period), each ox/cow year also being associated with one of the Chinese  wǔxíng, also known as the "five elements", or "phases": the "Five Phases" being Fire ( huǒ), Water ( shuǐ), Wood ( mù), Metal ( jīn), and Earth ( tǔ). The Year of the Ox follows after the Year of the Rat (the first year of the zodiacal cycle) which happened in 2020 and is then followed by the Year of the Tiger, which happened in 2022.

Zodiac

The term "zodiacal" refers to the classification scheme based on the lunar calendar that assigns an animal and its reputed attributes to each year in a repeating 12-year cycle. The 12-year cycle is an approximation to the 11.85-year orbital period of Jupiter. Originating from China, this form of the zodiac (with some variations) has been popular for a long time in many East Asian countries, such as Japan, South Korea, Vietnam, Cambodia, and Thailand. The ox symbolizes diligence and patience. The people with this age have progressed steadily and owns persistent strength. They are very determined but stubborn.

Meaning
The Ox (牛) is the second of the 12-year periodic sequence (cycle) of animals which appear in the Chinese zodiac related to the Chinese calendar, and also appears in related calendar systems. The Chinese term translated here as ox is in Chinese niú (牛), a word generally referring to cows, bulls, or neutered types of the bovine family, such as common cattle or water buffalo. The zodiacal ox may be construed as male, female, neutered, hermaphroditic, and either singular or plural. The Year of the Ox is also denoted by the Earthly Branch symbol chǒu (丑). The term "zodiac" ultimately derives from an Ancient Greek term referring to a "circle of little animals". There are also a yearly month of the ox and a daily hour of the ox (Chinese double hour, 1:00 a.m. to 3:00 a.m.). Years of the oxen (cows) are cyclically differentiated by correlation to the Heavenly Stems cycle, resulting in a repeating cycle of five years of the ox/cow (over a sixty-year period), each ox/cow year also being associated with one of the Chinese wǔxíng, also known as the "five elements", or "phases": the "Five Phases" being Fire (火 huǒ), Water (水 shuǐ), Wood (木 mù), Metal (金 jīn), and Earth (土 tǔ). The Year of the Ox follows after the Year of the Rat (the first year of the zodiacal cycle) which happened in 2020 and it then is followed by the Year of the Tiger which happened in 2022.

Differences with Western astrology
The term "zodiac" reflects similarities and differences with the Western zodiac. Both similarly have cycles divided into twelve parts, with at least the majority of those parts named for animals, and each is widely associated with an ascription of a person's personality or events in their life to a supposed influence of the person's particular relationship to the cycle. A major difference between the two is that the animals of the Chinese zodiac are not associated with constellations spanned by the ecliptic plane (that is, the part of the sky through which the Sun appears to move from the perspective of Earth). The Chinese/East Asian 12-part cycle corresponds to years, rather than months.

Mythological ox

The ox of the Chinese zodiac has a long history. In Chinese mythology, many myths about oxen or ox-like entities include celestial and earthly beings. The myths range from ones which include oxen or composite beings with ox characteristics as major actors to ones which focus on human or divine actors, in which the role of the oxen are more subsidiary. In some cases, Chinese myths focus on oxen-related subjects, such as plowing and agriculture or ox-powered carriage. Another important role for beef cattle is in the religious capacity of sacrificial offerings. Chinese mythology intersects with the idea of the zodiacal ox.

Great race
According to some old mythological traditions there was a race held by a great deity to determine which creatures, in which order, would be the namesakes of the twelve-year cycle. The race was run, and swum, the finishing line being across a great river. The Rat and the Ox crossed easily enough, the Ox due to being large, powerful, and adept both on land and in water: the Rat asked the good-natured Ox for a ride on its back, but then ungratefully jumped off at the last minute to cross the finish line first.

Years and the Five Elements

People born within these date ranges can be said to have been born in the "Year of the Ox", while bearing the following elemental phase sign:

Lunar Mansion

In traditional Chinese astrology as well as traditional Chinese astronomy the sky was mapped into various asterisms or what are sometimes referred to as Chinese constellations. This is actually more similar to the zodiac of Western astrology than is the 12 animal cycle. The stars along the plane of the ecliptic divide into groups known as the Twenty-Eight Mansions. Because the moon during its monthly cycle could be observed to appear to move from one mansion (or "camp") into the next each night in turn, they are also known as Lunar Mansions. Traditionally, these mansions were divided into four groups of seven each, and associated with one of four spiritual entities. This is applicable to the Year of the Ox, Chǒu (丑), a sign linked to the celestial region of the Black Warrior, or Xuánwǔ, linked to the stars of Beta Tauri, in modern astronomy.

Hour of the Ox

Main Chinese tradition divided the hours of a day-night period into 12 double-hours. Each of these double-hours corresponds with one of the twelve signs of the Chinese zodiac, with similar symbolic motif and astrological significance. The first of the twelve double hours is midnight (at the middle of the double-hour), corresponding with 11:00 p.m. to 1:00 a.m.: this is the Hour of the Rat. The second and next double-hour is the Hour of the Ox: 1:00 a.m. to 3:00 a.m.; that is the double-hour chǒu (丑).

Basic astrology elements

Around the world

In the Vietnamese zodiac, the water buffalo occupies the position of the Ox. In Nepal, the Tamu/Gurung people celebrate the year of the cow.

See also 
Bovidae in Chinese mythology
Burmese zodiac
Chinese astrology
Chinese calendar
Ox
Ox in Chinese mythology
Tibetan calendar
Water buffalo (zodiac)

References

Further reading

External links 
 

Chinese astrological signs
Mythological bovines
Bovidae